The 2019 PDC Unicorn Development Tour consisted of 20 darts tournaments on the 2019 PDC Pro Tour.

Prize money
The prize money for the Development Tour events remained the same from 2018, with each event having a prize fund of £10,000.

This is how the prize money is divided:

March

Development Tour 1
Development Tour 1 was contested on Saturday 9 March 2019 at the Robin Park Tennis Centre in Wigan.

Development Tour 2
Development Tour 2 was contested on Saturday 9 March 2019 at the Robin Park Tennis Centre in Wigan.

Development Tour 3
Development Tour 3 was contested on Sunday 10 March 2019 at the Robin Park Tennis Centre in Wigan.

Development Tour 4
Development Tour 4 was contested on Sunday 10 March 2019 at the Robin Park Tennis Centre in Wigan.

April

Development Tour 5
Development Tour 5 was contested on Saturday 20 April 2019 at the Robin Park Tennis Centre in Wigan.

Development Tour 6
Development Tour 6 was contested on Saturday 20 April 2019 at the Robin Park Tennis Centre in Wigan.

Development Tour 7
Development Tour 7 was contested on Sunday 21 April 2019 at the Robin Park Tennis Centre in Wigan.

Development Tour 8
Development Tour 8 was contested on Sunday 21 April 2019 at the Robin Park Tennis Centre in Wigan.

June

Development Tour 9
Development Tour 9 was contested on Saturday 8 June 2019 at the Marshall Arena in Milton Keynes.

Development Tour 10
Development Tour 10 was contested on Saturday 8 June 2019 at the Marshall Arena in Milton Keynes.

Development Tour 11
Development Tour 11 was contested on Sunday 9 June 2019 at the Marshall Arena in Milton Keynes.

Development Tour 12
Development Tour 12 was contested on Sunday 9 June 2019 at the Marshall Arena in Milton Keynes.

August

Development Tour 13
Development Tour 13 was contested on Saturday 17 August 2019 at Halle 39 in Hildesheim.

Development Tour 14
Development Tour 14 was contested on Saturday 17 August 2019 at Halle 39 in Hildesheim.

Development Tour 15
Development Tour 15 was contested on Sunday 18 August 2019 at Halle 39 in Hildesheim.

Development Tour 16
Development Tour 16 was contested on Sunday 18 August 2019 at Halle 39 in Hildesheim.

November

Development Tour 17
Development Tour 17 was contested on Saturday 2 November 2019 at the Robin Park Tennis Centre in Wigan.

Development Tour 18
Development Tour 18 was contested on Saturday 2 November 2019 at the Robin Park Tennis Centre in Wigan.

Development Tour 19
Development Tour 19 was contested on Sunday 3 November 2019 at the Robin Park Tennis Centre in Wigan.

Development Tour 20
Development Tour 20 was contested on Sunday 3 November 2019 at the Robin Park Tennis Centre in Wigan.

References

2019 in darts
2019 PDC Pro Tour